Marina Lavalle is a Mexican telenovela produced by Televisa for Telesistema Mexicano in 1965.

Cast 
María Rivas		
Enrique Aguilar		
Narciso Busquets		
Guillermo Zetina		
Héctor Andremar		
Magda Guzmán		
Eva Calvo		
María Teresa Rivas		
Fernando Luján		
Lupita Lara

References

External links 

Mexican telenovelas
1965 telenovelas
Televisa telenovelas
Spanish-language telenovelas
1965 Mexican television series debuts
1965 Mexican television series endings